The Oil, the Baby and the Transylvanians is a 1981 Romanian Red Western directed by Dan Pița.

It dramatises the struggles of Romanian and Hungarian settlers in a new land, the American frontier. Despite the American setting, including such minor details as use of the phrase "Bad-lands", it was shot entirely in Romania. A group of American Fulbright Scholars served as uncredited script consultants to make the English-language portion of the script sound more authentic.

It is a sequel to The Prophet, the Gold and the Transylvanians and The Actress, the Dollars and the Transylvanians, which are the first two parts of the trilogy.

Plot

The Oil, the Baby and the Transylvanians is the third part of a fairly successful Romanian trilogy about three Transylvanian brothers, their families, and their companions in frontier America, on the Great Plains. Set in the 1880s, the drama, comedy, and perhaps appeal of the film comes from the characters' difficulty in adjusting to the American rhythm and lifestyle.

The youngest of the Brad brothers, Romulus, and his American fiancée, June, are expecting a baby. The wedding celebration is eagerly anticipated by all the family and organised according to ancient Romanian customs.

Meanwhile, the middle brother John, who is honest, courageous, and fast on the draw, is held in increasingly high esteem by the townsfolk as he faces down a series of bullies and hoodlums, which sets up several gunslinging showdown scenes. Eventually John is elected as sheriff. He hunts these "Wanted" criminals to subsidise Romulus' decaying ranch.

Traian, the eldest of the three brothers, goes looking for water for his cattle and passes through the land of the Orbans, who are ironically Hungarian-Transylvanian farmers. The Orbans and Brads forge an important alliance and friendship against outside danger and violence. However, instead of finding water on his land, Traian finds oil. But will the promise of riches corrupt the brothers and tempt them away from their new home?

Crew

Main cast
Mircea Diaconu as Romulus (Romi) Brad
Ilarion Ciobanu as Traian Brad
Ovidiu Iuliu Moldovan as Ion Brad a.k.a. Jonn Brad
Tania Filip as June Brad, wife of Romi

Director
Dan Pița

Notes

External links

1981 films
The Transylvanians series
Films directed by Dan Pița
English-language Romanian films
Foreign films set in the United States